Brigadier General (BGen) (Bgen) is a one-star commissioned officer rank in the Swedish Army, Swedish Air Force and Swedish Amphibious Corps. Brigadier general ranks immediately above colonel and below a major general. The rank is equivalent to rear admiral (lower half) in the Swedish Navy.

History
In 1972, the so-called employment reform (tjänstställningsreformen) was implemented. In connection with the Swedish Armed Forces' increasing involvement in international operations with UN battalions and observers, it became increasingly clear that the Swedish service system did not quite correspond to what was common in other countries. A Swedish captain had basically the same training and service as a major in other countries' defense forces. In many cases, a Swedish colonel had tasks that in other armed forces were performed by brigadier generals. During the 1960s, this was solved many times by the Swedish officers being given a higher rank during their service abroad. The Supreme Commander suggested to the Swedish government that the Swedish service system should be changed, so that the captains would receive the rank of major and the majors would receive the rank of lieutenant colonel. He further proposed that a new general, brigadier general, be introduced. The government approved the Supreme Commander's proposal regarding captains and majors. No new general rank was introduced. The motivation for the government not following the Supreme Commander's proposal in this respect was that it did not want to contribute to an increase in the number of generals and admirals in the Swedish Armed Forces. However, the government decided to introduce the rank of överste av 1. graden (senior colonel) for the army and kommendör av 1. graden (senior captain) for the navy. The reform was implemented on 1 July 1972.

During the 1990s, the Swedish government raised the issue of introducing a rank for professional officers called brigadier general and flotilla admiral, respectively, and stated there, among other things, the following. For a few years, the Swedish Armed Forces had in various ways announced that they wished to change the current rank level system for professional officers. The idea was that the rank of överste av 1. graden and kommendör av 1. graden would be abolished and instead replaced with the rank of brigadier general and rear admiral (lower half). The reason for this was stated to be that then almost only Sweden did not have this rank. The increased international cooperation was thus considered to have been made more difficult. Denmark, Norway and Finland had recently introduced the brigadier general's rank. The government stated in the same bill that the issue should be prepared further before a position was taken on the proposal. In 1999, the government stated that the said rank should now be introduced and intended to make changes to the bill (1994:642) with instructions for the Swedish Armed Forces and the Officers Ordinance (1994:882) with effect from 1 July 2000.

The rank was finally introduced in 2000 and replaced the old rank of överste av 1. graden. Anyone who, according to older regulations, held the rank of överste av 1. graden would continue to hold that rank until otherwise decided. Thus, the rank of överste av 1. graden was placed between the rank of brigadier general and the rank of colonel. Unlike major generals, lieutenant generals, vice admirals and rear admirals which are appointed by the government, brigadier general are appointed by the Swedish Armed Forces themselves. In everyday speech, generals of all ranks are addressed as generals.

The rank is translated officially by the Swedish Armed Forces to Brigadier General. However, almost all officers in this rank do not command brigades, regiments or battalions; but take up senior tasks related to administration, staff, education, planning. Each of the (F)HQ units available (see Swedish Armed Forces) supports a unit which is commanded by a Brigadier General.

Rank insignia

Collar patches

Shoulder marks

Sleeve insignias

Amphibious Corps

Air Force

Hat insignia

Personal flags
The command flag of a brigader general (and a rear admiral (lower half)) is a double swallowtailed Swedish flag. In the first blue field 1 five-pointed white star.

Footnotes

References

Notes

Print

Military ranks of the Swedish Army
Military ranks of the Swedish Air Force

sv:Brigadgeneral